Ernest Durham Wooton (October 28, 1941 – May 29, 2020) was an American politician.

Wooton was born in Plaquemines Parish, Louisiana. He lived with his wife and family in Belle Chasse, Louisiana and went to Port Sulfur High School. Wooton served in the United States Army from 1964 to 1966. He went to Northwestern State University and Louisiana State University. Wooton was involved in the insurance business and in public relations with oilfield sales.

Wooton defeated Jiff Hingle in the 1983 election for Plaquemines Parish sheriff. Wooton held the office for two terms. He was defeated by Hingle in 1991 and 1995. Wooton was elected to the Louisiana House of Representatives in 1999, and served his first terms in the state legislature as a member of the Democratic Party. Wooten switched political affiliations to the Republican Party in 2005. He faced incumbent Republican David Vitter in the 2010 United States Senate elections in Louisiana as an independent candidate, listed as "other" on the ballot. In 2011, Wooton again faced Hingle in an election for Plaquemines Parish sheriff.

Notes

1941 births
2020 deaths
People from Belle Chasse, Louisiana
Businesspeople from Louisiana
Military personnel from Louisiana
Louisiana State University alumni
Northwestern State University alumni
Louisiana Independents
Louisiana Republicans
Members of the Louisiana House of Representatives
Louisiana sheriffs
Louisiana Democrats
21st-century American politicians
20th-century American politicians
American public relations people
American businesspeople in insurance
United States Army soldiers